Brudzew  is a village in Turek County, Greater Poland Voivodeship, in west-central Poland. It is the seat of the gmina (administrative district) called Gmina Brudzew.

The village has a population of 1,620.

References

Villages in Turek County